The 2015–2016 Toyota Finance 86 Championship was the third running of the Toyota Finance 86 Championship. The championship began on 7 November 2015 at Pukekohe Park Raceway and finished on 27 March 2016 at Taupo Motorsport Park after eighteen races held at six meetings.

Teams and Drivers 
All teams were New-Zealand registered.

Race calendar and results
All rounds were held in New Zealand. The round one in Pukekohe Park Raceway was held in support of the V8 Supercars. Rounds 3, 4 and 5 were held with the Toyota Racing Series.

Championship standings
In order for a driver to score championship points, they had to complete at least 75% of the race winner's distance, and be running at the finish. All races counted towards the final championship standings.

Scoring system

References

External links
 

Toyota Finance 86 Championship
Toyota Finance 86 Championship
Toyota Finance 86 Championship